Antony Béraud, real name Antoine-Nicolas Béraud, (11 January 1791 – 6 February 1860) was a French military, chansonnier, writer, poet, historian and playwright.

Life 
In 1809 he entered the École militaire de Saint-Cyr and became second lieutenant. He was then sent to garrison at Milan and took part to the last campaigns of the Empire. Captain, he was captured at the battle of the Mincio River on 8 February 1814. Captain of staff during the Hundred Days, he served at Grenoble then participated to the battle of Waterloo and battle of Ligny where he gained the rank of battalion chief.

Dismissed, degraded and put on half pay under Louis XVIII, he then embarked on literature and collaborated to numerous magazines : Revue et gazette des théâtres, La Minerve, L'Abeille, L'Indépendant, La Boussole politique, La Pandore, Le Siècle, Les Salons de Paris, les Annales de l'école française et des beaux-arts etc.

His poems and songs directed against the Bourbon earned him six months' imprisonment. He was particularly active in the Trois Glorieuses, was awarded the croix de juillet and was returned his Légion d'honneur. He was also reinstated as battalion commander of the National Guard of Paris, a position he would leave in 1834.

In 1832 he was awarded a medal of the city of Paris for his bravery during the cholera epidemic.

Managing director of the Théâtre Saint-Marcel (1839), then of the Théâtre de l'Ambigu (1840-1849), in 1849 he became director of the prison of Belle-Isle en mer (1849-1850).

His plays were performed on the most important Parisian stages, including: Théâtre de l'Ambigu, Théâtre de la Gaîté, Théâtre de la Porte-Saint-Martin, and Théâtre de l'Odéon.

Works 
1815 : Lettres à mon ami et à ma maîtresse, poems
1815 : La dauphinoise, song
1826 : Satires ménippées sur les principaux événements de la Révolution française, avec des notes critiques et historiques, par un ancien troubadour
1817-1818 : Mémoires pour servir à l'histoire des évènements de la fin du dix-huitième siècle depuis 1760 jusqu'en 1806-1810, 6 vol., with Jean-François Géorgel
1818 : Le Champ d'asile, Serrez-vous bien, songs
1818 : Les Veillées d'une captive, with Auguste Imbert and Louis-François L'Héritier
1819 : Le départ du poète
1819 : Les Modes parisiennes, almanach pour l'année 1820
1820 : Amour, orgueil et sagesse, short stories
1821: La liberté, Ode à David exilé, Le rappel, poems
1822 : Trois jours de promenade d'un étudiant en droit
1824 : Un mot sur le tableau d'Iphigénie, refusé par le jury de peinture, au Salon de 1824
1824 : Nouveaux mémoires pour servir à l'histoire de l'empereur Napoléon
1825 : Dictionnaire historique de Paris
1827 : Cri d'un vieux soldat à l'ex-garde nationale
1831 : Veilles poétiques
1832 : Introduction à toutes les histoires de France, ou Histoire des peuples qui ont habité la Gaule, depuis les temps les plus reculés jusqu'à Clovis
1833 : Histoire pittoresque de la Révolution française
1834 : L'Avenir des peuples, histoire contemporaine des mœurs, des arts, de l'industrie, du commerce, des voyages
1835 : Mémoires inédits de Henri Masers de Latude, with Henri Masers de Latude
1835 : Veilles patriotiques
1836 : Le Pendu, histoire d'une grande dame de la restauration napolitaine et du baron Pierre Férat, aujourd'hui galérien
1836 : Versailles et son musée, à-propos en vers
1848 : Le Nœud républicain, couplets chantés au banquet fraternel donné par la 5me compagnie du 2me bataillon de la 6e légion

Theatre 

 Les Deux coups de sabre, drama in 3 acts, with Charles Puysaye, 1822
 Cardillac ou Le quartier de l'Arsenal, melodrama in three acts, with Léopold Chandezon, 1824
 Les Aventuriers, ou le Naufrage, melodrama in 3 acts, with Léopold Chandezon, 1824
 Cagliostro, melodrama in 3 acts, with Léopold Chandezon, 1825
 Les Prisonniers de guerre, melodrama in 3 acts, with Chandezon, 1825
 La Redingotte et la perruque, ou le Testament, mimodrama in 3 acts à grand spectacle, with Chandezon, 1825
 Charles Stuart, ou le Château de Woodstock, melodrama in 3 acts, à grand spectacle, with Eugène Cantiran de Boirie, 1826
 Le Corregidor ou les Contrebandiers, melodrama in 3 acts, with Chandezon, 1826
 Le monstre et le magicien, melodrama féerique in three acts, with Merle, 1826
 Le monstre et le magicien, melodrama, with Jean-Toussaint Merle and Crosnier, 1826
 Irène ou la prise de Napoli, melodrame in 2 acts, with Chandezon, 1827
 Le vétéran, pièce militaire in 2 acts, with Chandezon, 1827
 Faust, drama in 3 acts, with Jean-Toussaint Merle and Charles Nodier, 1828
 La Duchesse et le page, comedy in 3 acts, in prose, 1828
 Le Siège de Saragosse, pièce militaire in 2 acts à grand spectacle, 1828
 Tom-Wild, ou le Bourreau, melodrama in 3 acts, with Auguste Anicet-Bourgeois, 1828
 Le Fou, drama in 3 acts, with Alexis Decomberousse and Gustave Drouineau, 1829
 Nostradamus, drama in 3 acts and 6 parts, with Valory, 1829
 Adrienne Lecouvreur, with Valory, 1830
 Guido Reni ou Les artistes, play in 5 acts and in verses, with Jean-Nicolas Bouilly, 1833
 Le gars, drama in five acts and six tableaux, 1837
 Lélia, drama in 3 acts, in prose, with Jules-Édouard Alboize de Pujol, 1838
 La verrerie de la gare, drame anecdotique et populaire in 3 acts, 1838
 Le prêteur sur gages, drama in trois acts, with Henri de Saint-Georges, 1838
 Napoléon, drame historique in 3 acts and 5 tableaux, with Théophile Marion Dumersan, 1839
 Meurtre et dévouement, drama in 3 acts, 1839
 Édith ou La veuve de Southampton, drama in 4 acts, with Alphonse Brot, 1840
 Francesco Martinez, drama in three acts, 1840
 Le maître à tous, comedy in 2 acts, with Charles Potier, 1840
 La Lescombat, drama in 5 acts, with Brot, 1841
 Le Miracle des roses, drama in 16 tableaux, with Hippolyte Hostein, 1844
 Le Rôdeur, ou les Deux apprentis, drama in 3 acts, with Chandezon, 1844
 Hortense de Blengie, comédie-drame in 3 acts, with Frédéric Soulié, 1848
 Entre l'enclume et le marteau, comédie en vaudevilles in 1 act, 1850
 Taconnet, ou l'Acteur des boulevards, vaudeville in 5 acts, with Clairville, 1852
 Un Festival, comédie en vaudevilles in 1 act, 1853
 Les Guides de Kinrose, drame-vaudeville in 2 acts, with Édouard Brisebarre, 1854

Bibliography 
 Gustave Vapereau, Dictionnaire universel des contemporains, (p. 169) read on line 
 Pierre Larousse, Grand Dictionnaire Universel du XIXe siècle, 1865, (p. 595) read on line
 Camille Dreyfus, André Berthelot, La Grande encyclopédie, 1886, (p. 259)
 Guillaume de Bertier de Sauvigny, Alfred Fierro, Bibliographie critique des mémoires sur la Restauration, 1988, (p. 28)
 Edward Forman, Historical Dictionary of French Theater, 2010, (p. 24)

19th-century French dramatists and playwrights
French chansonniers
19th-century French poets
19th-century French historians
People from Aurillac
1791 births
1860 deaths